Daniel Zahno (born in Basel, 8 November 1963) is a Swiss writer.

He studied English and Germanic Philology at the University of Basel.

He is a member of Authors of Switzerland and has received literature prizes like Würth-Literaturpreis in 1996.

Works
 Doktor Turban, 1996
 Im Hundumdrehen,2006
 Die Geliebte des Gelatiere, 2009
 Rot wie die Nacht, 2010
 Alle lieben Alexia, 2011
 Manhattan Rose, 2013
 Wanderverführer, 2015

References

External links
www.danielzahno.ch

1963 births
Living people
20th-century Swiss writers
21st-century Swiss writers
Writers from Basel-Stadt
University of Basel alumni